Tell Us the Truth is the debut album by English punk rock band Sham 69, released in 1978. The first side of the album was recorded live in concert, while the other was recorded in the studio. Tell Us the Truth includes one of Sham 69's biggest hits, "Borstal Breakout", on the live side of the album. The album peaked at number 25 on the UK Albums Chart.

Tell Us the Truth and the band's second album That's Life were re-released in 1989 as a double LP.

Track listing
All songs written by Jimmy Pursey and Dave Parsons
Live side
 "We Got a Fight"
 "Rip Off"
 "Ulster"
 "George Davis Is Innocent"
 "They Don’t Understand"
 "Borstal Breakout"
Studio side
 "Family Life"
 "Hey Little Rich Boy"
 "I’m a Man, I’m a Boy"
 "What About the Lonely?"
 "Tell Us the Truth"
 "It’s Never Too Late"
 "Who's Generation!"
Captain Oi! bonus tracks
 "What Have We Got" (live)
 "I Don't Wanna" produced by John Cale
 "Red London" produced by John Cale
 "Ulster" (single version) produced by John Cale
 "Borstal Breakout" (single version)
 "George Davis Is Innocent" (demo) produced by Howard Thompson and Sham 69; engineered by Steve Lillywhite
 "They Don't Understand" (demo) produced by Howard Thompson and Sham 69; engineered by Steve Lillywhite
 "Borstal Breakout" (demo) produced by Howard Thompson and Sham 69; engineered by Steve Lillywhite
Tracks 15-17 released as "I Don't Wanna" single on Step Forward
"Borstal Breakout" released as Polydor Records debut single, January 1978

Personnel
Sham 69
Jimmy Pursey – vocals, production, liner notes
Dave Parsons – guitars, liner notes
Dave "Kermit" Tregunna – bass guitar
Mark "Dodie" Cain – drums
with:
Albie "Slider" Maskell - bass guitar on tracks 15-17 and 19-21

Technical
Peter Wilson – production
Brian Burrows – remixing
Steve Hammonds – project coordinator
Jo Mirowski – art direction, design
Alwyn Clayden – package design
Martyn Goddard – photography
Barry Plummer – photography

Charts

Release history

References

1978 debut albums
Sham 69 albums
Polydor Records albums
Sire Records albums